Zhai Yanpeng (born December 6, 1982) is a former Chinese football player who played for Bayi Football Team and Dalian Shide as a versatile defender and midfielder. After winning the Chinese league and Cup with Dalian Shide, he was soon called up to the Chinese national team in 2007; however, in early 2008 he was forced to end his career as a professional footballer at the age of 26, due to being diagnosed with cerebral infarction.

Club career

Bayi Football Team
Zhai Yanpeng began his football career in 1993 playing for the Bayi Football Team youth and reserve teams before graduating to their senior team in 2001. In his first season, he quickly established himself as a versatile footballer and quickly became a first team regular when he played in 23 league games. For the next two seasons he was an integral member of the Bayi team until they disbanded in 2003 and were removed from the top tier.

Dalian Shide
Zhai Yanpeng moved to another top tier team in Dalian Shide, where he was predominantly used as a left-back in his first season and while he took time to settle in his new team, by the 2005 league season Zhai had established himself as an important member of the team when he helped them win the league and cup double. He was an integral part of the Dalian team for several seasons until his condition saw him having to retire during 2008 when he was diagnosed with cerebral infarction.

International career
The Chinese head coach Zhu Guanghu gave Zhai Yanpeng his debut on March 27, 2007, in a friendly game against Uzbekistan in a 3–1 victory in preparation for the 2007 AFC Asian Cup and used Zhai Yanpeng as a defensive midfielder. Unable to make the squad for the Asian Cup, he was still highly regarded by the new Chinese Head coach Vladimir Petrović to play in several friendlies until his condition forced him to retire.

Honours
Dalian Shide
 Chinese Super League: 2005
 Chinese FA Cup: 2005

References

External links
 
 Player info at sina.com

1982 births
Living people
Sportspeople from Baoding
Chinese footballers
Footballers from Hebei
China international footballers
Association football fullbacks
Bayi Football Team players
Dalian Shide F.C. players